Maksym Ihorovych Braharu (born 21 July 2002) is a Ukrainian professional footballer who plays as a forward for Chornomorets Odesa.

References

External links
 Profile on Chornomorets Odesa official website
 
 

2002 births
Living people
Ukrainian Premier League players
Ukrainian First League players
Ukrainian Second League players
FC Chornomorets Odesa players
FC Chornomorets-2 Odesa players
Association football forwards
Ukrainian footballers
Ukraine under-21 international footballers
Ukrainian people of Romanian descent
Sportspeople from Odesa Oblast